Odulimomab is an investigational drug for the prevention of transplant rejection and for the treatment of various immunological diseases.

It is a mouse monoclonal antibody directed against the alpha chain of the protein lymphocyte function-associated antigen 1 which is involved in immune reactions.

References 

Monoclonal antibodies